The Way I Feel is the second studio album by Canadian singer-songwriter Gordon Lightfoot, originally released in 1967 on the United Artists label.

Reception

In his Allmusic review, critic Richie Unterberger praised the album, writing "The songs weren't quite as impressive as his first batch, but they were still very good, highlighted by the epic "Canadian Railroad Trilogy" and an electrified remake of "The Way I Feel."(#36 Canada) "Go-Go Round" reached #27.
A cover of "Home From the Forest" by Ronnie Hawkins reached #60 in Canada, February 3, 1968.
A cover of "The Way I Feel" by Fotheringay reached #71 in Canada, April 24, 1971.

Track listing

Personnel
 Gordon Lightfoot – guitar, piano, vocals
 Red Shea – lead guitar
 John Stockfish – bass
 Ken Buttrey – percussion
 Charles McCoy – 3rd guitar, harmonica, celeste, bells

Cover photography by Barry Feinstein
Cover notes by Robert Markle

References

External links
Album lyrics and chords

Gordon Lightfoot albums
1967 albums
United Artists Records albums